Budisava is a suburban settlement of the city of Novi Sad, Serbia. The village has a Serb ethnic majority and its population numbers 3,656 people (2011 census).

Name
In Serbian, the village is known as Budisava or Будисава, in Hungarian as Tiszakálmánfalva, in Croatian as Budisava, and in German as Waldneudorf.

History
It was first mentioned in 1884.

Population
Besides 2,260 Serbs, there was also a sizable Hungarian minority, numbering 1,204 people.

Gallery

See also
 List of places in Serbia
 List of cities, towns and villages in Vojvodina

References

 Slobodan Ćurčić, Broj stanovnika Vojvodine, Novi Sad, 1996.

External links

 www.budisava.net
 Kratak opis Budisave (Serbian)

Suburbs of Novi Sad
Places in Bačka
South Bačka District